The Kyōtoku incident (享徳の乱, Kyōtoku no Ran) was a long series of skirmishes and conflicts fought for control of the Kantō region of Japan in the 15th century. The conflict began in 1454 with the assassination of Uesugi Noritada by Kantō kubō Ashikaga Shigeuji. The Ashikaga, Uesugi, and other clans then leapt to battle, either defending or assaulting Shigeuji. The chaos ended in 1482, when a peace was negotiated.

Chronology
Ashikaga Shigeuji was appointed to the post of Kantō kubō (shōguns deputy in the Kantō region) in 1449, the first Ashikaga to hold the post since his father's death ten years earlier. At that point, in 1439, Uesugi Norizane had seized power for his clan. Ten years later, the Uesugi remained powerful in the Kantō; in 1454, Shigeuji arranged to have his deputy, Uesugi Noritada, killed.

This was taken as rebellion against the Ashikaga shogunate, and armed conflict quickly broke out. Shigeuji then fled the area, to Koga, in Shimotsuke Province, and became known as the Koga kubō. The Uesugi called for the shogunate to send a new kubō to replace Shigeuji, and in 1459, the shōguns brother, Ashikaga Masatomo, arrived to take up that position. However, Shigeuji's supporters refused to acknowledge this, and maintained Shigeuji's rightful claim to the post. Masatomo set up his new home in Horigoe, in Izu Province. As the fighting continued, both claimed to be on the side of the shogunate; but both sides prevented one another from wielding true power, and so the Uesugi were once again in control of the region.

Due to their growing power and numbers, the Uesugi clan now split in three branches (Yamanouchi, Ōgigayatsu, and Inukake), named after the localities within the Kantō where they resided.

The Ōnin War broke out in Kyoto in 1467, signalling the end of the shogunate's real power and the beginning of the Sengoku period, a period of chaos and war which would last 150 years. Fighting in the Kantō between the Ashikaga and Uesugi calmed for about ten years, resuming in 1477 and ending in 1482, with negotiations for peace.

Notes

References

 Frédéric, Louis (2002).  Japan Encyclopedia. Cambridge: Harvard University Press. ; OCLC 48943301
   Matsuo, Kenji. (1997).  Chūsei toshi Kamakura wo aruku: Minamoto no Yoritomo kara Uesugi Kenshin made (中世都市鎌倉を步く 源頼朝から上杉謙信まで).  Tokyo: Chūō Kōronsha. ; 
 Hall, John Whitney. (1988).  The Cambridge History of Japan: Medieval Japan. Cambridge: Cambridge University Press.  
 Sansom, George Bailey. (1961).  A History of Japan: 1334–1615. Stanford: Stanford University Press. 

Wars involving Japan
15th century in Japan
1450s in Japan
1454 in Asia
1480s in Japan
1482 in Asia
1460s in Japan
1470s in Japan